The 1923 Kentucky gubernatorial election was held on November 6, 1923. Democratic nominee William J. Fields defeated Republican nominee Charles I. Dawson, the attorney general, with 53.25% of the vote. The Democratic State Central Executive Committee chose Fields to replace nominee J. Campbell Cantrill, a U.S. representative who died suddenly on September 2 two months before the election.

Primary elections
Primary elections were held on August 4, 1923.

Democratic primary

Candidates
J. Campbell Cantrill, U.S. Representative
Alben W. Barkley, U.S. Representative

Results

General election

Candidates
Major party candidates
William J. Fields, Democratic
Charles I. Dawson, Republican

Other candidates
William S. Demuth, Farmer–Labor
M. A. Brinkmar, Socialist

Results

References

1923
Kentucky
1923 Kentucky elections